Breaking Benjamin is the self-titled debut extended play (EP) by American rock band Breaking Benjamin. The EP was released in 2001 around the band's hometown of Wilkes-Barre, Pennsylvania, where all 2,000 copies sold out in the weeks following its release. All five tracks were re-recorded for the band's major label debut album, Saturate (2002).

Release
Recorded at Saturation Acres in Danville, Pennsylvania, the EP is rock group Breaking Benjamin's first and only independent release before being signed to a record label. It was here that the band had recorded, and released 2,000 copies of their self-titled EP, as well as putting their first single "Polyamorous" into heavy rotation at local rock station 97.9 X. All copies of the EP promptly sold out, and the band was soon signed to Hollywood Records.

Notes
The EP contains versions of five songs which were re-recorded for Breaking Benjamin's first major label studio release, Saturate. Some tracks contain only minor alterations to their Saturate counterparts, such as the chorus in "Medicate". Likewise, the vocal tracks for both "Shallow Bay" and "Water", featured on the EP, are in fact the same vocal tracks as heard on the Saturate counterparts. Another alteration to the Saturate counterpart is that the five songs featured on the EP are slightly heavier.

As this was a starting point in the band's career, they did not have much funds for high end studio equipment or studio time and it was in fact 'DJ Freddie' Fabbri who supplied funds for studio time and funds for the manufacturing of the CD itself. It was these gestures and Freddie's enthusiasm towards the band's single "Polyamorous" and the career of the band, which led to the band hiring DJ Freddie Frabbri as their manager.

Recorded before Aaron Fincke and Mark James left Lifer, the EP is thus the only CD released by Breaking Benjamin as a three-piece band. Today, the EP can mostly be found on online markets and in pawn shops around the area the EP was first distributed. The fourth track on the EP, titled as "Water", has been remixed as a "remastered EP version" with Jonathan "Bug" Price on the bass, and it was later added to their first compilation album, Shallow Bay: The Best of Breaking Benjamin, as it for the songs "Medicate" and "Polyamorous". It was released on August 16, 2011.

Track listing

Personnel

Benjamin Burnley – vocals, rhythm guitar, lead guitar
Jonathan "Bug" Price – bass
Jeremy Hummel – drums

References

2001 debut EPs
Breaking Benjamin albums